Dan Sartin (born June 23, 1946) is a former American football defensive tackle. He played for the San Diego Chargers in 1969.

References

1946 births
Living people
American football defensive tackles
Ole Miss Rebels football players
San Diego Chargers players
Memphis Southmen players
Detroit Wheels players